Parasynthemis regina is a species of dragonfly in the family Synthemistidae,
known as the royal tigertail. 
It is a medium to large and slender dragonfly with a long body and black and yellow markings.
It inhabits stagnant pools and swamps in eastern Australia

Parasynthemis regina is also known as Synthemis regina.

Gallery

See also
 List of Odonata species of Australia

References

Synthemistidae
Odonata of Australia
Endemic fauna of Australia
Taxa named by Edmond de Sélys Longchamps
Insects described in 1874